Blanche of Ponthieu (1322 – 12 May, 1387), was suo jure Countess of Aumale, and by marriage, Countess of Harcourt.

She was born in 1322 to John II, Count of Aumale (died 1340) and Catherine of Artois, daughter of Philip of Artois and Blanche of Brittany.

Blanche married John V, Count of Harcourt (1320 – 1355) between 1330 and 1340 and had 7 children:

John VI, Count of Harcourt (1342 – 1389), Count of Aumale and Harcourt
Louis (died 1388), Viscount of Châtellerault
William (died 1400), Lord of La Ferté-Imbault
Philip (1345 – c. 1414), Baron of Bonnetable
James (1350-1405), Lord of Montgommery
Joan, married to Raoul de Coucy
Alix, married to Aubert de Hangest

References

 Patrick Van Kerrebrouck, Les Capétiens : 987-1328, P. Van Kerrebrouck, 1er janvier 2000, 766 p. (ISBN 978-2-9501509-4-3,

Counts of Aumale
1322 births
1387 deaths